This is a sub-list of the List of marine bony fishes of South Africa for spiny-finned fishes recorded from the oceans bordering South Africa.
This list comprises locally used common names, scientific names with author citation and recorded ranges. Ranges specified may not be the entire known range for the species, but should include the known range within the waters surrounding the Republic of South Africa.

List ordering and taxonomy complies where possible with the current usage in Wikispecies and may differ from the cited source, as listed citations are primarily for range or existence of records for the region.

Sub-taxa within any given Taxon are arranged alphabetically as a general rule. Synonyms may be listed where useful.

Superorder Acanthopterygii — Spiny-finned fishes

Order Cetomimiformes — Whalefishes

Family: Barbourisiidae — Red whalefish
Barbourisia rufa Parr, 1954 (occasionally trawled off West Coast. Atlantic Ocean (56°N- 35°S))

Family: Cetomimidae — Whalefishes
Cetomimus indagator Rofen, 1959 (1 specimen off Port St Johns, former Transkei)
Cetomimus picklei (Gilchrist, 1922) (1 specimen off Cape Town)

Family: Rondeletiidae — Redmouth whalefish
Rondeletia loricata Abe and Hotta, 1963 (3 specimens taken off Southern Cape coast of South Africa)

Order Syngnathiformes

Family: Aulostomidae — Trumpetfishes
Trumpetfish Aulostomus chinensis (Linnaeus, 1766) (Ind-West Pacific south to East London)

Family: Centriscidae — Snipefishes and shrimpfishes 
Razorfish or shrimpfish Aeoliscus punctulatus (Bianconi, 1855) (Port Elizabeth to Kenya)
Banded snipefish Centriscops obliquus Waite, 1911 (Cape Columbine to False Bay)
Slender snipefish Macroramphosus scolopax (Linnaeus, 1758) (Table Bay to Durban)
Round bellowsfish Notopogon lilliei Regan, 1914 (Single specimen off Natal)
Longsnout bellowsfish Notopogon macrosolen Barnard, 1925 (Northwest of Cape Town to Saldanha Bay)
Longspine bellowsfish Notopogon xenosoma Regan, 1914 (Algoa Bay to Natal)

Family: Fistulariidae — Flutemouths
Smooth flutemouth Fistularia commersonii Rüppell, 1938  (widespread Indo-Pacific south to Mossel Bay)
Serrate flutemouth Fistularia petimba Lacepède, 1803 (Atlantic, Indian and western Pacific oceans; east coast of Africa south to Mossel bay; also reported from Walvis Bay and False Bay)

Family: Solenostomidae — Ghost pipefishes
Ghost pipefish Solenostomus cyanopterus Bleeker 1854 (Indo-Pacific region including India, Japan and Australia, and south to East London)(one specimen reported from False Bay)

Family: Syngnathidae — Seahorses and pipefishes
Roughridge pipefish Cosmocampus banneri (Herald and Randall, 1972) (Two specimens from Sodwana Bay)
Narrowstripe pipefish Doryrhamphus bicarinatus Dawson, 1981 (Sodwana Bay)
Banded pipefish Doryrhamphus dactyliophorus (Bleeker, 1853) (one specimen at Aliwal shoal)
Bluestripe pipefish Doryrhamphus excisus excisus Kaup, 1856 (Xora river mouth to Mozambique)
Many-banded pipefish Doryrhamphus multiannulatus (Regan, 1903) (one subadult taken at Sodwana bay)
Dusky pipefish Halicampus dunckeri (Chabanaud, 1929) (One specimen taken in Sodwana bay)
Brown pipefish Halicampus mataafae (Jordan and Seale, 1906) (one specimen taken in Sodwana Bay)
Belly pipefish Hippichthys heptagonus Bleeker, 1849 (Durban, St Lucia and 'nHtunga lakes, Natal)
Bellybarred pipefish Hippichthys spicifer (Rüppell, 1838) (Durban and Xora river mouth)
Giraffe seahorse or Crowned seahorse Hippocampus camelopardalis Bianconi, 1854 (Durban to Inhambane)
Knysna seahorse Hippocampus capensis Boulenger, 1900 (South coast estuaries: Knysna, Keurbooms, Mossel Bay and Plettenberg Bay)
Thorny seahorse Hippocampus histrix Kaup, 1853 (vicinity of Durban)
Yellow seahorse Hippocampus kuda Bleeker, 1852 (Mossel bay to Mozambique)
Longnose seahorse Hippocampus trimaculatus Leach, 1814 (Morgan Bay near kei river mouth)
Crowned seahorse Hippocampus whitei Bleeker, 1855 (Natal and southern Mozambique)
Shortnose pipefish Micrognathus andersonii Bleeker, 1858 (Knysna to Xora river)
Freshwater pipefish Microphis fluviatilis (Peters, 1852) (Coffee Bay and Mtata river)
Short-tail pipefish Microphis brachuris (Bleeker, 1853) (Durban and Sodwana estuary to Kenya)
Elegant pipefish Nannocampus elegans Smith, 1961 (Great Fish point to Inhaca, Mozambique)
Reef pipefish Nannocampus pictus (Duncker, 1915) (one specimen from Sodwana Bay)
Rock pipefish Phoxocampus belcheri (Kaup, 1856) (one specimen from Bizana coast (31.5°S), Transkei)
Alligator pipefish Syngnathoides biaculeatus (Bloch, 1785) (Knysna northwards; Northern Red sea to Japan, Guam and Samoa)
Longsnout pipefish Syngnathus temminckii Kaup, 1856 (Namibia to northern KwaZulu-Natal),
River pipefish Syngnathus watermeyeri Smith, 1963 (Tidal areas of Kariega, Kasouga and Bushmans rivers)
Double-ended pipefish Trachyrhamphus bicoarctatus (Bleeker, 1857) (Durban northwards to Kenya)

Series Atherinomorpha

Order Atheriniformes

Suborder: Atherinoidei
Family: Atherinidae — Silversides
Cape silverside Atherina breviceps Valenciennes, 1835 (Luderitz to northern KwaZulu-Natal)
Hardyhead silverside Atherinomorus lacunosus (Forster, 1801) (East London to Indo-West Pacific)
Pricklenose silverside Atherion africanus Smith, 1965 (Natal to India)
Slender silverside Hypoatherina barnesi Schultz, 1953 (Natal to Comores)

Family: Notocheiridae — Surf sprites
Surf sprite Iso natalensisRegan, 1919 (Indian ocean south to Cape Agulgas)

Order Beloniformes

Suborder: Belonoidei

Superfamily: Exocoetoidea

Family: Exocoetidae — Flyingfishes
Blackwing  flyingfish Cheilopogon cyanopterus (Valenciennes, 1846) (Tropical and subtropical Atlantic, Indian and Pacific oceans. One juvenile from Port Alfred, another from Natal)
Spotfin flyingfish Cheilopogon furcatus (Mitchill, 1815) (offshore in all tropical seas. Off South African coast from the Cape eastwards)
Blackfin flyingfish Cheilopogon nigricans (Bennett, 1840) (Tropical eastern Atlantic to Indo-West Pacific. One specimen known from South African waters)
Smallhead flyingfish Cheilopogon pinnatibarbatus altipinnis (Valenciennes, 1846) (Cape to Kosi Bay)
Two-wing flyingfish Exocoetus monocirrhus (Richardson, 1846) (Indo-West Pacific south to Durban)
Tropical two-wing flyingfish Exocoetus volitans (Linnaeus, 1758) (worldwide in tropical waters, occasionally seen in South African waters)
Subtropical flyingfish Hirundichthys rondeletii (Valenciennes, 1846) (widely distributed in subtropical waters of all oceans, common off the Cape)
Mirrorwing flyingfish Hirundichthys speculiger (Valenciennes, 1846) (worldwide in tropical waters, one juvenile from Mbibi, Zululand, another from False Bay)
Sailfin flyingfish Parexocoetus brachypterus (Richardson, 1846) (Tropical Indo-Pacific, south to Natal)
Shortfin flyingfish Prognichthys brevipinnis (Valenciennes, 1846) (Tropical Indo-West Pacific, recorded from Lake St. Lucia and Indian Ocean off South Africa)
Shortnose flyingfish Prognichthys sealei (Abe, 1955) (Tropical Indo-West Pacific; one adolescent off Cape St. Lucia and a small juvenile from Port Elizabeth)

Family: Hemiramphidae — Halfbeaks
Ribbon halfbeak Euleptorhamphus viridis (van Hasselt, 1823) (reported from Table Bay, also known from Algoa bay and Kei river Mouth. Tropical and temperate waters of Indo-Pacific)
Spotted halfbeak Hemiramphus far (Forsskål, 1775) (Knysna to Delagoa Bay. a few records west to False Bay)
Tropical halfbeak Hyporhamphus affinis (Günther, 1866) (Sodwana Bay to tropical west Indo-Pacific)
Cape halfbeak Hyporhamphus capensis (Thominot, 1886) (False Bay to southern Mozambique)

Superfamily: Scomberesocoidea
Family: Belonidae — Needlefishes
Barred needlefish Ablennes hians (Valenciennes, 1846) (Worldwide in tropical and subtropical waters, south to Algoa Bay)
Cape needlefish Petalichthys capensis Regan, 1904 (South African endemic, False Bay to Pondoland)
Garfish or Yellow needlefish or Banded needlefishStrongylura leiura (Bleeker, 1850) (Durban to Persian Gulf)
Crocodile needlefish Tylosurus crocodilus crocodilus (Peron and Lesueur, 1821) (Indo-West Pacific south to Knysna)

Family: Scomberesocidae — Sauries
Dwarf saury Nanichthys simulans Hubbs and Wisner, 1980 (Warm temperate waters of the Atlantic and southern Indian oceans; Off the Cape up the west coast)

Series Percomorpha

Order Beryciformes

Suborder: Berycoidei
Family: Berycidae — Berycids
Beryx Beryx decadactylus Cuvier, 1829 (Saldanha Bay to Natal)
Slender beryx Beryx splendens Lowe, 1834 (Saldanha Bay to Natal)
Short alfonsino Centroberyx spinosus (Gilchrist, 1903) (Storms river to Durban) (also reported from False Bay)

Suborder: Holocentroidei

Family: Holocentridae — Squirrelfishes and Soldierfishes
Subfamily: Holocentrinae — Squirrelfishes
Spotfin squirrelfish Neoniphon sammara (Forsskål, 1775) (Tropical Indo-Pacific south to Durban)
Tailspot squirrelfish Sargocentron caudimaculatum (Rüppell, 1838) (Red sea and Indo-Pacific south to Xora river mouth, Transkei)
Crown squirrelfish Sargocentron diadema (Lacepède, 1802) (Durban to Mozambique) (Indo-Pacific south to East London)
Dark-striped squirrelfish Sargocentron praslin (Lacepède, 1802) (Indo-West Pacific reported by Smith to reach Durban, but no specimens available from south of Mozambique)
Speckled squirrelfish Sargocentron punctatissimum (Cuvier, 1829) (Indo-Pacific south to Algoa Bay)
Sabre squirrelfish Sargocentron spiniferum (Forsskål, 1775) (Red sea and east coast of Africa south to Natal)

Subfamily: Myripristinae — Soldierfishes
Shadowfin soldier Myripristis adusta Bleeker, 1853 (Indo-Pacific south to Natal)
Bigscale soldier Myripristis berndti Jordan and Evermann, 1903 (Indo-Pacific south to Natal)
Yellowfin soldier Myripristis chryseres Jordan and Evermann, 1903 (Aliwal shoal)
Epaulette soldier Myripristis kuntee (Cuvier, 1831) (Indo-Pacific south to Natal)
Pale soldier Myripristis melanosticta Bleeker, 1863 (Indian ocean (Sri Lanka, Maldives and Sodwana Bay) to Japan and New Hebrides)
Blotcheye soldier Myripristis murdjan (Forsskål, 1775) (Transkei to Mozambique)(Red Sea and Ind-Pacific south to Natal)
Lattice soldier Myripristis violacea Bleeker, 1851 (Indo-Pacific south to Natal)
Shy soldier Plectrypops lima (Valenciennes, 1831) (Indo-West Pacific south to Natal)

Suborder: Trachichthyoidei

Family: Anoplogastridae — Fangtooth
Fangtooth Anaplogaster cornuta (Valenciennes, 1839) (In Agulhas current to about 29°S; north of 35°S off west coast. Worldwide between 46&degN and 46°S)

Family: Diretmidae — Diretmids
Diretmoides parini Post and Quero, 1981 (Tropical to temperate in Atlantic ocean with gap between 7°N -17°S; probably curcumglobal in southern oceans)

Family: Monocentridae — Pineapple fishes
Pineapple fish Monocentris japonicus (Houttuyn, 1782) (Indo-West Pacific and Red Sea south to Mossel Bay)(Recorded from False Bay on at least two occasions)

Family: Trachichthyidae — Slimeheads
Gephyroberyx darwini (Johnson, 1866) (all round South African coast)
Hoplostethus atlanticus Collett, 1896 (From Iceland to Morocco and Walvis Bay to off Durban)
Black slimehead Hoplostethus cadenati Quero, 1974 (West coast of Africa from 36°N - 26°S, and off Transkei)
Hoplostethus mediterraneus Cuvier, 1829 (Namibia to Natal)
Hoplostethus melanopterus Fowler, 1938 (known from off Transkei, Somalia and the Philippines)
Hoplostethus melanops (Weber, 1913) (Indo-West pacific from Indonesia to Natal, also off Namibia and Cape Town)

Order Gasterosteiformes

Family: Pegasidae — Seamoths
Seamoth Eurypegasus draconis (Linnaeus, 1766) (Indo-West Pacific south to Algoa Bay)
Longtail seamoth Pegasus volitans Linnaeus, 1758 (Tropical Indo-West Pacific south to Durban)

Order Perciformes — Perciform (perch-like) fishes
See article List of marine Perciform fishes of South Africa

Order Pleuronectiformes — Flatfishes
Suborder: Pleuronectoidei

Family: Achiropsettidae

Neoachiropsetta milfordi (Penrith, 1965) (off Cape Town, Argentina, Falkland Islands and New Zealand)(syn. Mancopsetta milfordi Penrith, 1965)

Family: Bothidae — Lefteye flounders

Cape flounder Arnoglossus capensis Boulenger, 1898 (Angola to Natal)
East coast flounder Arnoglossus dalgleishi (von Bonde, 1922) (Natal, Zanzibar, Mombasa and northern Indian Ocean)
Tropical flounder Bothus mancus (Broussonet, 1782) (Durban to Hawaii and Easter Island)
Disc flounder Bothus myriaster (Temminck & Schlegel, 1846) (Definitely known from Inhambane, juveniles and larvae possibly occur south to Cape St. Blaize. Southeast Africa to Taiwan and Japan)
Leopard flounder Bothus pantherinus (Rüppell, 1830) (Confirmed records from Port Alfred northward, juveniles possibly south to Cape St. Blaize. Indo-West Pacific from South Africa to Hawaii)
Pelican flounder Chascanopsetta lugubris Alcock, 1894 (Natal to Delagoa Bay, Indo-Pacific and Atlantic Oceans)
Broadbrow flounder Crossorhombus valderostratus (Alcock, 1890) (Durban to St. Lucia Bay, possibly reaches East London)
Warthog flounder Engyprosopon grandisquama (Temminck & Schlegel, 1848) (Indo-Pacific, Durban to Japan)
Natal flounder Engyprosopon natalensis (Regan, 1920) (Known only from off Amatikulu River, Natal)
Engyprosopon smithi Nielsen, 1964 (Known only from 3 specimens from off Durban and Kenya)
Khaki flounder Laeops natalensis Norman, 1931 (Known only from Natal)
Blackspotted flounder Laeops nigromaculatus von Bonde, 1922 (Natal, Delagoa Bay and Japan)
Longarm flounder Laeops pectoralis (von Bonde, 1922) (Natal, Delagoa Bay and Mombasa)
Crosseyed flounder Neolaeops microphthalmus (von Bonde, 1922) (One specimen from Natal, also known from Japan, Taiwan and Indo-Australian Archipelago)
Psettina brevirictis (Alcock, 1890) (Record from South Africa based on juvenile collected off Port St. Johns)

Family: Citharidae — Largescale flounders

Largescale flounder Citharoides macrolepis (Gilchrist, 1905) (Known only from Natal to Kenya)

Family: Paralichthyidae

Largetooth flounder Preudorhombus arsius (Hamilton-Buchanan, 1822) (Indo-West Pacific south to Algoa Bay and possibly to Knysna)
Ringed flounder Pseudorhombus elevatus Ogilby, 1912 (Indian Ocean south to Algoa Bay)
Smalltooth flounder Pseudorhombus natalensis Gilchrist, 1904 (Durban and off Tugela River)

Family: Pleuronectidae — Righteye flounders

Comb flounder Marleyella bicolorata (von Bonde, 1922) (Natal to India)
Measles flounder Paralichthodes algoensis Gilchrist, 1902 (Known only from Mossel Bay to Delagoa Bay)
Poecilopsetta natalensis Norman, 1931 (Natal to Kenya)
Crested flounder Samaris cristatus Gray, 1831 (Natal to Red Sea and China)
Threespot flounder Samariscus triocellatus Woods, 1966 (Sodwana Bay)

Suborder: Soleoidei

Family: Cynoglossidae — Tonguefishes
Natal tonguefish Cynoglossus acaudatus Gilchrist, 1906 (Natal to Somalia)
Fourline tonguefish Cynoglossus attenuatus Gilhrist, 1904 (Durban to Delagoa Bay)
Sand tonguefish Cynoglossus capensis (Kaup, 1858)(Kunene River (Namibia) to Port Elizabeth)(to Natal)
Durban tonguefish Cynoglossus durbanensis Regan, 1921 (Natal to Kenya)
Ripplefin tonguefish Cynoglossus gilchristi Ogilby, 1910 (Natal and Delagoa Bay)
Roughscale tonguefish Cynoglossus lida (Bleeker, 1851) (Philippines to Mozambique, south to Durban)
Threeline tonguefish Cynoglossus marleyi Regan, 1921 (Durban to Delagoa Bay)
Redspotted tonguefish Cynoglossus zanzibarensis Norman, 1939 (Saldanha Bay to Kenya)
Fringelip tonguefish Paraplagusia bilineata (Bloch, 1787) (Tropical Indo-Pacific: East coast of Africa south to Durban)
Symphurus ocellatus von Bonde, 1922 (Durban to Mozambique)
Symphurus variegatus (Gilchrist, 1903) (Known only off East London)

Family: Soleidae — Soles
Unicorn sole Aesopia cornuta Kaup, 1858 (Natal to Mozambique)
West coast sole Austroglossus microlepis (Bleeker, 1863)(Cape to KwaZulu-Natal)(Northern Namibia to False Bay)
East coast sole Austroglossus pectoralis (Kaup, 1858) (Cape Point to Durban)
Cape sole Heteromycteris capensis Kaup, 1858 (Walvis Bay to Maputo)
Foureye sole Monochirus ocellatus (Linnaeus, 1758) (Natal)
Dwarf sole Parachirus xenicus Matsubara & Ochiai, 1963 (Sodwana Bay)
Speckled sole Pardachirus marmoratus (Lacepède, 1802) (Red Sea and western Indian Ocean from Sri Lanka and Persian Gulf to Durban)
Persian carpet sole Pardachirus morrowi (Chabanaud, 1954) (Kenya to Sodwana Bay)
Blackhand sole Solea bleekeri Boulenger, 1898 (Cape Columbine to Maputo)(False Bay to Maputo)
Lemon sole Solea fulvomarginata Gilchrist, 1904 (False Bay to Transkei)
Shallow-water sole Synaptura marginata Boulenger, 1900 (Knysna to Delagoa Bay)
Lace sole Synapturichthys kleini (Risso, 1833) (Eastern Atlantic and Mediterranean to South Africa and round south coast to Durban)
Zebra sole Zebrias regani (Gilchrist, 1906) (Known only from Natal)

Order Scorpaeniformes

Suborder: Cottoidei

Superfamily: Cottoidea

Family: Psychrolutidae — Fatheads
Cottunculus spinosus Gilchrist, 1906 (off Cape Point) 
Ebinania costaecanarie (Cervigon, 1961) (off north western South Africa)
Psychrolutes inermis (Vaillant, 1888) (off western South Africa)
Psychrolutes macrocephalus (Gilchrist, 1904) (known only from South Africa)

Superfamily: Cyclopteroidea

Family: Liparidae — Snailfishes
Careproctus albescens Barnard, 1927 (off Cape Point)
Paraliparis australis Gilchrist, 1904 (off Cape Point)
Paraliparis copei Goode & Bean, 1896 (Northwest Atlantic, Azores and South Africa. off Cape Point)
Paraliparis micruris (Barnard, 1927) (Cape of Good Hope, southern Indian Ocean and South Pacific)

Suborder: Dactylopteroidei
Family: Dactylopteridae — Helmet gurnards
Helmet gurnard Dactyloptena orientalis (Cuvier, 1829) (Port Elizabeth northwards; east to central Pacific)
Starry helmet gurnard Dactyloptena peterseni (Nyström, 1887) (East London and Delagoa Bay)

Suborder: Platycephaloidei

Family: Hoplichthyidae — Spiny flatheads
Spiny flathead Hoplichthys acanthopleurus Regan, 1908 (off Natal)

Family: Parabembridae
African deepwater flathead Parabembras robinsoni Regan, 1921 (Durban to southern Mozambique)

Family: Platycephalidae — Flatheads
Crocodile flathead Cociella crocodila (Tilesius, 1812) (Durban northwards and from Red sea to Japan and Guadalcanal)
Spotfin flathead Cociella sp. (East London north to Madagascar and Oman)
Thorny flathead Grammoplites portuguesus (Smith, 1953) (Durban to Beira)
Large-scale flathead Onigocia oligolepis (Regan, 1908) (three specimens known from Natal)
Madagascar flathead Papilloculiceps longiceps (Ehrenberg, 1829) (Widespread from Durban north to Red sea)
Bartail flathead Platycephalus indicus (Linnaeus, 1758) (Cape Agulhas to Mozambique)(Widespread from Mossel bay northward to Red sea and Japan and Australia)
Sand flathead Thysanophrys arenicola Schultz, 1966 (Natal north to Seychelles; Chagos archipelago; Indonesia, Australia, Philippines and Marshall Islands)
Quarterspined flathead Thysanophrys celebica (Bleeker, 1854)  (Durban north to Zanzibar)
Longsnout flathead Thysanophrys chiltonae Schultz, 1966 (Red sea and Indo-West Pacific from northern Natal to Australia)
Fringelip flathead Thysanophrys otaitensis (Parkinson, 1829) (Natal north to Seychelles, and throughout tropical Indo-Pacific)

Suborder: Scorpaenoidei

Family: Apistidae
Bearded waspfish Apistus carinatus (Bloch, 1801) (Natal northwards, coastal areas of Indo-West Pacific)

Family: Aploactinidae — Velvetfishes
Roughskin scorpionfish Cocotropus monacanthus (Gilchrist, 1906) (4 specimens from off Natal)
Crested scorpionfish Ptarmus jubatus (Smith, 1935) (Natal coast north to Porto Amelia, Mozambique) 

Family: Caracanthidae — Coral crouchers
Spotted croucher Caracanthus madagascariensis (Guichenot, 1869) (Tropical western and central Indian ocean, south to Sodwana Bay)
Coral croucher Caracanthus unipinna (Gray, 1831) (Tropical waters throughout Indo-Pacific; reaches Sodwana bay)

Family: Congiopodidae — Horsefishes
Spinenose horsefish Congiopodus spinifer (Smith, 1839) (Walvis Bay to Natal)
Smooth horsefish Congiopodus torvus (Gronovius, 1772) (Namibia to Pondoland)

Family: Scorpaenidae
Subfamily: Choradactylinae
Threestick stingfish Choridactylus natalensis (Gilchrist, 1902) (Durban to Mozambique)

Subfamily: Minoinae
Onestick stingfish Minous coccineus Alcock, 1890 (Durban, northwards; also in Red sea, Arabian sea and eastwards to gulf of Thailand)

Subfamily: Pteroinae
Shortfin turkeyfish Dendrochirus brachypterus (Cuvier, 1829) (Transkei north to Red sea and east to central Pacific)
Zebra turkeyfish Dendrochirus zebra (Cuvier, 1829) (off Durban; northwards to Red sea and eastwards to central Pacific)
Blackfoot firefish Parapterois heterurus (Bleeker, 1856) (Natal and northwards across Indian ocean to western Pacific)
Broadbarred firefish Pterois antennata (Bloch, 1787) (KwaZulu-Natal northwards and to central Pacific)
Devil Firefish Pterois miles (Bennett, 1828) (Port Elizabeth northwards)(Port Alfred northwards to Red sea and eastern Indian ocean)
Deepwater firefish Pterois mombasae (Smith, 1957) (off Durban, Sri Lanka and New Guinea)
Radial firefish Pterois radiata Cuvier, 1829 (KwaZulu-Natal to Mozambique)(Sodwana Bay northwards and to central Pacific)
Plaintail firefish Pterois russelii Bennett, 1831 (Kwa-Zulu-Natal northward and to western Pacific)

Subfamily: Scorpaeninae
Decoy scorpionfish Iracundus signifer Jordan and Evermann, 1903 (one taken off Sodwana Bay)
Spotfin scorpionfish Neomerinthe nielseni (Smith, 1964) (several specimens from off Durban)
Ocellated scorpionfish Parascorpaena mcadamsi (Fowler, 1938) (Sodwana Bay, Zululand, and Mozambique to Pacific)
Golden scorpionfish Parascorpaena mossambica (Peters, 1855) (Xora and Sodwana Bay northwards, east Africa to central Pacific)
Phenacoscorpius adenensis Norman, 1939 (near Buffalo River)
Speckled deepwater scorpionfish Pontinus leda Eschmeyer, 1969 (off west coast from gulf of Guinea to 18°45'S)
Blacklash scorpionfish Pontinus nigerimum Eschmeyer, 1983 (one specimen off Natal)
Popeyed scorpionfish Rhinopias frondosa (Günther, 1891) (Durban north along African coast and east to Japan and Caroline Islands)
Bigscale scorpionfish Scorpaena scrofa Linnaeus, 1758 (Algoa bay to Natal)
Guam scorpionfish Scorpaenodes guamensis Quoy and Gaimard, 1824 ((Transkei northwards and throughout Indo-West Pacific)
Hairy scorpionfish Scorpaenodes hirsutus (Smith, 1957) (Sodwana Bay northwards, scattered localities in Indo-West Pacific to Hawaii and Tahiti)
Dwarf scorpionfish Scorpaenodes kelloggi (Jenkins, 1903) (Sodwana bay and scattered localities in Indo-Pacific, east to Hawaii and Tahiti)
Cheekspot scorpionfish Scorpaenodes littoralis (Tanaka, 1917) (a few specimens from deep reefs off Natal; also scattered localities in Indo-West Pacific)
Coral scorpionfish Scorpaenodes parvipinnis (Garrett, 1863) (Durban northwards; widespread on coral reefs throughout Indo-West Pacific)
Blotchfin scorpionfish Scorpaenodes varipinnis Smith, 1957 (Sodwana bay and northwards in western Indian Ocean)
Bigmouth scorpionfish Scorpaenopsis brevifrons Eschmeyer and Randall, 1975 (Sodwana bay northward; also at scattered localities in the Indo-Pacific)
False stonefish Scorpaenopsis diabolus Cuvier, 1829 (Xora northwards, widespread in Indo-West Pacific.)
Humpback scorpionfish Scorpaenopsis gibbosa Bloch and Schneider, 1801 (Transkei northwards, Indian Ocean and Red sea)
Gilchrist's scorpionfish Scorpaenopsis gilchristi (Smith, 1957) (1 specimen off Tugela river)
Smallscale scorpionfish Scorpaenopsis oxycephala Bleeker, 1849 (Sodwana Bay and scattered localities in the Indo-Pacific)
Spinycrown scorpionfish Scorpaenopsis possi Randall & Eschmeyer, 2001(Sodwana Bay northwards, throughout Indo-Pacific))
Raggy scorpionfish Scorpaenopsis venosa (Cuvier, 1829) (Durban northwards and scattered localities in Indo-Pacific)
Yellowspotted scorpionfish Sebastapistes cyanostigma (Bleeker, 1856) (Port Alfred northwards to Red sea and east to central Pacific)
Spineblotch scorpionfish Sebastapistes mauritiana (Cuvier, 1829) (Transkei northwards, scattered Indo-Pacific localities)
Barchin scorpionfish Sebastapistes strongia (Cuvier, 1829) (Transkei northwards, widespread in Indo-Pacific)
Darkspotted scorpionfish Sebastapistes tinkhami (Fowler, 1946) (Sodwana bay, western and south Pacific)
Paperfish ir Leaf scorpionfish Taenianotus triacanthus Lacépède, 1802 (Durban northwards and to central Pacific)

Family: Sebastidae
Jacopever Helicolenus dactylopterus (Delaroche, 1809) (Walvis Bay to Natal)
False jacopever Sebastes capensis (Gmelin, 1788) (Cape to Saldanha Bay)
Cape scorpionfish Trachyscorpia capensis (Cape to St Helena Bay)

Family: Setarchidae
Setarches guentheri Johnson, 1862 (Natal, nearly worldwide in warm seas)

Family: Synanceiidae — Stonefish
Stonefish Synanceia verrucosa Bloch & Schneider, 1801(Red sea and Indo-Pacific south to Durban)

Family: Tetrarogidae — Waspfishes
Redskinfish Ablabys binotatus (Peters, 1855) (Xora river mouth to Zanzibar)
Smoothskin scorpionfish Coccotropsis gymnoderma (Gilchrist, 1906) (Cape to Algoa bay)

Family: Triglidae — Gurnards
Cape gurnard Chelidonichthys capensis (Cuvier, 1829) (Cape Fria to Maputo)
Bluefin Gurnard Chelidonichthys kumu (Cuvier, 1829) (Cape Point to Delagoa Bay)
Lesser gurnard Chelidonichthys queketti (Regan, 1904) (Table bay to Natal)
Prickly gurnard Lepidotrigla faurei (Gilchrist & Thompson, 1914) (Durban northwards to India)
Spiny gurnard Lepidotrigla multispinosa Smith, 1934 (Natal to Kenya)
African gurnard Trigloporus lastoviza (Bonnaterre, 1788) (St. Sebastian Bay to Port Alfred)(syn. Trigloporus lastoviza africanus (Smith, 1934))

Order Stephanoberyciformes

Family: Melamphaidae — Bigscale fishes
Melamphaes eulepis Ebeling, 1962 (Atlantic south of 13°S, around Africa, in Indian Ocean, throughout Indonesia and in central equatorial Pacific)
Melamphaes microps (Günther, 1878) (off South Africa and New Zealand)
Melamphaes simus Ebeling, 1962 (Tropical/subtropical regions of Atlantic, Indian and Pacific oceans)
Poromitra crassiceps (Günther, 1878) (All oceans except Arctic and Mediterranean)
Poromitra megalops (Lütken, 1877) (Eastern Atlantic, Indo-Pacific and eastern equatorial Pacific)
Scopeloberyx robustus (Günther, 1887) (Tropical/subtropical regions of Atlantic, Indian and Pacific oceans)
Scopelogadus beanii (Günther, 1887) (Atlantic, southern Indian and western south Pacific oceans)
Sio nordenskjoldii (Lönnberg, 1905) (South Atlantic and Indian oceans south of 30°S; several records off South Africa)

Family: Stephanoberycidae — Pricklefishes
Acanthochaenus lutkeni Gill, 1884 (off mid Atlantic USA, Azores and off Durban (29°42'S, 33°19'E)

Order Tetraodontiformes

Family: Balistidae — Triggerfishes

Starry triggerfish Abalistes stellatus (Lacepède, 1798) (Red Sea to Mossel Bay)
Orangestriped triggerfish Balistapus undulatus (Mungo Park, 1797) (Red Sea south to Natal)
Queen triggerfish Balistes vetula Linnaeus, 1758 (Tropical Atlantic to southern Angola; recordef from"Cape of Good Hope by Günther. Doubtful records from Port Alfred and Durban)
Clown triggerfish Balistoides conspicillum (Bloch & Schneider, 1801) (Indo-West Pacific south to Durban)
Rough triggerfish Canthidermis maculatus (Bloch, 1786) (Orange River mouth to Natal)
Indian triggerfish Melichthys indicus Randall and Klausewitz, 1973 (Tropical Indian Ocean south to Sodwana Bay
Black triggerfish Melichthys niger (Bloch, 1786) ((Circumtropical, has been found at Durban)
Pinktail triggerfish Melichthys vidua (Solander, 1844) (Tropical Indo-Pacific south to Durban)
Redfang triggerfish Odonus niger (Rüppell, 1836) (Tropical Indo-West Pacific south to Durban and once to Port Alfred)
Yellowface triggerfish Pseudobalistes flavimarginatus (Rüppell, 1829) (Red Sea south to Natal)
Rippled triggerfish Pseudobalistes fuscus (Bloch & Schneider, 1801) (Red Sea south to Durban)
Blackbar triggerfish Rhinecanthus aculeatus (Linnaeus, 1758) (Indo-West Pacific south to Algoa Bay)
Patchy triggerfish Rhinecanthus rectangulus (Bloch & Schneider, 1801)  (Tropican Indo-West Pacific south to East London)
Boomerang triggerfish Sufflamen bursa (Bloch & Schneider, 1801) (Tropical Indo-West Pacific south to Sodwana Bay))
Halfmoon triggerfish Sufflamen chrysopterus (Bloch & Schneider, 1801) Indo-West Pacific south to Durban)
Bridle triggerfish Sufflamen fraenatus (Latrielle, 1804) (Indo-West Pacific south to Natal)
Striped triggerfish Xanthichthys lineopunctatus (Hollard, 1854) (Indo-West Pacific south to Port Alfred)
Outrigger triggerfish Xenobalistes punctatus Heemstra & Smith, 1983 (One specimen from west of Algoa Bay)

Family: Diodontidae — Burrfishes and porcupinefishes

Spotfin burrfish Chilomycterus reticulatus (Linnaeus, 1758) (Only juveniles reported from Cape to Salt Vlei, worldwide in warm temperate waters)
Birdbeak burrfish Cyclichthys orbicularis (Bloch, 1785) (Knysna to South China Sea, Philippines and Australia))
Yellow-spotted burrfish Cyclichthys spilostylus (Leis & Randall, 1982) (Cape to Port Alfred and northwards to South China Sea, Philippines and Australia)
Pelagic porcupinefish Diodon eydouxii Brisout de Barneville, 1846 (Known from Algoa Bay. pelagic, circumtropical)
Balloon porcupinefish Diodon holocanthus Linnaeus, 1758 (Cape to Knysna and northward. Circumtropical)
Porcupinefish Diodon hystrix Linnaeus, 1758 (Tsitsikamma Coastal National Park to Umtata river, Circumtropical)
Shortspine porcupinefish Diodon liturosus Shaw, 1804 (Port Elizabeth to Japan, French Polynesia and Australia)
Fourbar porcupinefish Lophodiodon calori (Bianconi, 1855) (Continental shelf from the Cape to South China Sea and Australia)

Family: Molidae — Ocean sunfishes

Sharptail sunfish Masturus lanceolatus (Lienard, 1840) (Warm temperate waters of all oceans; recorded from the Cape to East London)
Ocean sunfish Mola mola (Linnaeus, 1758) (All oceans but not polar seas)
Southern sunfish Mola ramsayi (Giglioli, 1883) (Known only from New Zealand, Australia and South Africa. Collected from near East London to Port St. Johns)
Trunkfish Ranzania laevis (Pennant, 1776) (Cape to Transkei; All oceans)

Family: Monacanthidae — Filefishes

Unicorn leatherjacket Aluterus monoceros Linnaeus, 1758 ((Saldanha Bay to Beira)
Scribbled leatherjacket Aluterus scriptus (Osbeck, 1765) (Worldwide in tropical and subtropical seas, south to Knysna)
White-spotted filefish Cantherhines dumerilii (Hollard, 1854) (Tropical Indo-Pacific south to Algoa Bay)
Spectacled filefish Cantherhines fronticinctus (Günther, 1867) (Tropical Indo-West Pacific south to Durban)
Honeycomb filefish Cantherhines pardalis (Rüppell, 1837) (Tropical/subtropical Indo-West Pacific, south to Mossel Bay)
Blacksaddle mimic Paraluteres prionurus (Bleeker, 1851) (Tropical Indo-West Pacific south to Aliwal Shoal, Natal)
Wedgetail filefish Paramonacanthus barnardi Fraser-Brunner, 1941 (East coast of Africa south to Durban)
Blackstriped filefish Paramonacanthus cingalensis (Fraser-Brunner, 1941) (Tropical Indian Ocean south to Umgazi River, Transkei)
Redtail filefish Pervagor janthinosoma (Bleeker, 1854) (Indo-West Pacific, juveniles reach Algoa Bay)
Rhino leatherjacket Pseudalutarius nasicornis (Temminck & Schlegel, 1850) (Tropical/subtropical Indo-West Pacific; has been founs at Port Alfred, East London and Bazaruto)
Porky Stephanolepis auratus (Castelnau, 1861) (Known only from Knysna to Zanzibar)
Sandy filefish Thamnaconus arenaceus(Barnard, 1927) (Known from only 3 specimens, 1 possibly from Natal, 2 from Madagascar)
Modest filefish Thamnaconus modestoides (Barnard, 1927) (Indian Ocean south to Algoa Bay)

Family: Ostraciidae — Boxfishes

Subfamily: Aracaninae
Chubby basketfish Anoplocapros robustus (Fraser-Brunner, 1941) (one specimen from Algoa Bay)(syn. Strophiurichthys robustus Fraser-Brunner, 1941)

Subfamily: Ostraciinae

Longhorn cowfish Lactoria cornuta (Linnaeus, 1758) (Indo-West Pacific to Mossel Bay)
Spiny cowfish Lactoria diaphana (Bloch & Schneider, 1801) (Indo-West Pacific south to the Cape)
Backspine cowfish Lactoria fornasini (Bianconi, 1846) (Indo-West pacific south to Algoa Bay)
Boxy Ostracion cubicus Linnaeus, 1758 (Indo-West Pacific south to Knysna))
Whitespotted boxfish Ostracion meleagris Shaw, 1796 (Indo-Pacific south to Algoa Bay)
Triangular boxfish Tetrosomus concatenatus (Bloch, 1786) (From the Cape eastwards through Indo-West Pacific)
Hunchback boxfish Tetrosomus gibbosus (Linnaeus, 1758) (Red Sea south to Durban)

Family: Tetraodontidae — Blaasops or Puffers

Evileye blaasop Amblyrhynchotes honckenii (Bloch, 1785) (Cape Point to Mozambique. Tropical Indo-West Pacific from South Africa to China)
Whitespotted blaasop Arothron hispidus Linnaeus, 1758 (Tropical Indo-West Pacific south to Knysna)
Blackedged blaasop Arothron immaculatus (Bloch & Schneider, 1801) (Indo-West Pacific south to Knysna)
Bellystriped blaasop Arothron inconditus (Smith, 1958) (Knysna to East London)
Map blaasop Arothron mappa (Lesson, 1827) (Indo-West Pacific south to Natal)
Guineafowl blaasop Arothron meleagris (Bloch & Schneider, 1801) (Indo-Pacific south to Durban)
Blackspotted blaasop Arothron nigropunctatus (Bloch & Schneider, 1801) (Indo-West Pacific south to Algoa bayMossel Bay)
Star blaasop Arothron stellatus (Bloch & Schneider, 1801) (Indo-West Pacific, occasionally reaches Knysna)
Spotted toby Canthigaster amboinensis (Bleeker, 1864) (Tropical Indo-Pacific south to Durban)
Exquisite toby Canthigaster bennetti (Bleeker, 1854) (Tropical Indo-West Pacific south to Port Alfred)
Saddle toby Canthigaster coronata (Vaillant & Sauvage, 1875) (Red Sea to Sodwana Bay)
Honeycomb toby Canthigaster janthinoptera (Bleeker, 1855) (Indo-West Pacific south to Transkei)
Doubleline toby Canthigaster rivulata (Schlegel, 1850) (Indo-West Pacific south to Algoa Bay)
Bicoloured toby Canthigaster smithae Allen & Randall, 1977 (Southwestern Indian Ocean south to Durban)
False-eye toby Canthigaster solandri (Richardson, 1844) (Indo-West Pacific south to Port Elizabeth)
Model toby Canthigaster valentini (Bleeker, 1853) (Indo-West Pacific south to Durban)
Bluespotted blaasop Chelonodon laticeps Smith, 1948 (6°S to Xora River mouth)
Blaasop beauty Chelonodon pleurospilus Regan, 1919 (Xora River mouth to Durban)
Blackback blaasop Lagocephalus guentheri Miranda Ribeiro, 1915 (off Tugela River to Algoa Bay)
Smooth blaasop Lagocephalus inermis (Schlegel, 1850) (Indo-Pacific south to Algoa Bay)
Oceanic blaasop Lagocephalus lagocephalus (Linnaeus, 1758) (Circumglobal in warm and temperate seas, Walvis Bay to Beira)
Moontail blaasop Lagocephalus lunaris (Bloch & Schneider, 1801)(Indo-West Pacific south to Knysna)
Silverstripe blaasop Lagocephalus scleratus (Forster, 1788) (Indo-West Pacific, occasional specimens occur between the Cape and Natal)
Rippled blaasop Pelagocephalus marki Heemstra & Smith 1981 (Port Alfred to Knysna)
Blunthead blaasop Sphoeroides pachygaster (Müller & Troschel, 1848) (Circumglobal, deep water from the Cape to Beira)
Lattice blaasop Takifugu oblongus (Bloch, 1786) (Indo-West Pacific south to Natal)
Dwarf blaasop Torquigener hypselogeneion (Bleeker, 1852) (Indo-West Pacific from Knysna to Samoa)
Slender Blaasop Torquigener sp. (known from South Africa only from 2 specimens collected off Durban)
Spiny blaasop Tylerius spinosissimus Regan, 1908 (Indo-West Pacific south to East London)

Family: Triacanthodidae — Spikefishes

Trumpetsnout  Macrorhamphosodes uradoi (Kamohara, 1933) (1 record from off Port Elizabeth; Kenya to Japan)
Sawspine spikefish Paratriacanthodes retrospinis (Fowler, 1934) (Japan and China to Mozambique and Natal)
Shortsnout spikefish Triacanthodes ethiops Alcock, 1894 (Japan to South Africa)
Fleshy lipped spikefish Tydemania navigatoris Weber, 1913 (Japan to east coast of Africa,; several records from South Africa)

Order Zeiformes

Suborder: Caproidei
Family: Caproidae — Boarfishes
Boarfish Antigonia rubescens (Günther, 1860) (Indo-West Pacific from Natal to Japan)

Suborder: Zeioidei

Family: Grammicolepididae — Tinselfishes
Thorny tinselfish Grammicolepis brachiusculus Poey, 1873 (Saldanha Bay to Durban)
Tinselfish Xenolepidichthys dalgleishi Gilchrist, 1922 (Walvis Bay to Natal)

Family: Oreosomatidae — Oreos
Allocyttus verrucosus (Gilchrist, 1906) (Walvis Bay to Mozambique channel)
Neocyttus rhomboidalis Gilchrist, 1906 (Walvis Bay to Cape)
Oxeye dory Oreosoma atlanticum Cuvier, 1829 (Around South Africa between 30° - 35°S)
Pseudocyttus maculatus Gilchrist, 1906 (Walvis Bay to the Cape)

Family: Zeidae — Dories
Cyttopsis rosea (Lowe, 1843) (off Natal, Eastern Atlantic from France to Southern Angola, Caribbean and Gulf of Mexico, Southwest coast of India, Maldives and Japan)
Cyttus traversi Hutton, 1872 (Walvis ridge and off cape town to Algoa bay, south coast of Australia and New Zealand)
Buckler dory Zenopsis conchifer (Lowe, 1850) (Walvis Bay to Natal and north to India)
Cape dory Zeus capensis Valenciennes, 1835 (St Helena Bay to Natal)
John dory Zeus faber Linnaeus, 1758 (common along whole SA coast)

Family: Zenionidae — Zeniontids
Zenion leptolepis (Gilchrist and von Bonde, 1924) (Natal, Delagoa Bay and Kenya)

Series Mugilomorpha

Order Mugiliformes
Family: Mugilidae — Mullets
Diamond mullet Liza alata (Steindachner, 1892) (Indo-West Pacific to Algoa bay)
Groovy mullet Liza dumerili (Steindachner, 1870) (Breede River to Bazaruto)
St. Lucia mullet Liza luciae (Penrith & Penrith, 1967) (Northern Transkei to southern Mozambique)
Large-scale mullet Liza macrolepis (Smith, 1846) (Indo-West Pacific to Port Alfred)
Giantscle mullet Liza melinoptera (Valenciennes, 1836) (Indo-West Pacific, occasional specimens reach Natal)
Southern mullet Liza richardsonii (Smith, 1846) (Kunene River to St. Lucia estuary)
Striped mullet Liza tricuspidens (Smith, 1935) (Mossel Bay to northern Kosi estuary)
Squaretail mullet Liza vaigiensis (Quoy and Gaimard, 1825) (Indo-West Pacific, south to Durban)
Flathead mullet Mugil cephalus Linnaeus, 1758 (All warm and temperate seas, estuaries and rivers)
Freshwater mullet Myxus capensis (Valenciennes, 1836) (Knysna to KwaZulu-Natal)
Bluetail mullet Valamugil buchanani (Bleeker, 1854) (Knysna to Indo-West Pacific)
Longarm mullet Valamugil cunnesius (Valenciennes, 1836) (Indo-West Pacific, occasionally reaches Natal)
Bluespot mullet Valamugil seheli (Forsskål, 1775) (Indo-West Pacific south to Transkei)

References 

South Africa
fish
'spiny-finned
Marine biodiversity of South Africa